Neptis jamesoni, or Jameson's large sailer, is a butterfly in the family Nymphalidae. It is found in Nigeria (the Cross River loop), Cameroon, the Republic of the Congo, the Central African Republic and the Democratic Republic of the Congo.

References

Butterflies described in 1890
jamesoni
Butterflies of Africa
Taxa named by Frederick DuCane Godman
Taxa named by Osbert Salvin